The 1995 Colorado State Rams football team represented Colorado State University in the 1995 NCAA Division I-A football season. The Rams were led by third-year head coach Sonny Lubick and played their home games at Hughes Stadium in Fort Collins, Colorado. They competed as members of the Western Athletic Conference, finishing in a four-way tie for first with Air Force, BYU, and Utah. It was Colorado State's second consecutive conference title. The Rams were invited to the 1995 Holiday Bowl, where they were defeated by Kansas State.

Schedule

References

Colorado State
Colorado State Rams football seasons
Colorado State Rams football